George Michel Bakar (born 20 April 1946 in Cairo, Egypt) is an Archeparch of the Melkite Greek Catholic Church.

See also
 List of Melkite Greek Catholic Patriarchs of Antioch
 Patriarch of Antioch
 Eastern Catholic Churches

References

External links
 http://www.pgc-lb.org/eng/melkite_greek_catholic_church/the-Hierarchy

Melkite Greek Catholic bishops
1946 births
Egyptian Christian clergy
Living people
Clergy from Cairo
Egyptian Melkite Greek Catholics
Eastern Catholic bishops in Africa